CT University (CTU) is a  private university on Ferozepur Road, Ludhiana, Punjab, India.It was established in 2016 under C.T. University Act, 2016 (Punjab Act No. 50 of 2016). The university is approved by University Grants Commission.

CTU offers a full range of academic programs at the undergraduate, postgraduate and doctoral level.

CTU is multi-disciplinary, student-centric, industry driven and research-focused university offering a full range of academic programs at the diploma, undergraduate, post graduate and doctoral levels. The CT University campus is a digitally transformed university campus meant to facility New Education Policy. Other main features include a 24*7 robotics and automation lab, BOSCH lab, the Research  & Innovation for Excellence working lab.  CTU has entered the fashion industry by launching its brand ‘Fab CT’.  The School of Hotel Management & Airline Tourism has started Aryana Bakery, with sale outlets on the campus itself. The university has joined with MAX Super Specialty Hospital Mohali, IVY Health & Life Sciences P Ltd, Indus Healthcare, Sankara Eye Hospital, Mohandai Oswal Hospital etc. for programmes involving optometry and healthcare. It has other programmes with IBM for BBA, MBA, BCA and B.Tech. An IIC cell is established for young peoples to conduct research and development and to encourage them to generate business ideas and start-ups, file patents, generate funds from government agencies, and so on. More than 70 patents have been filed.  Students do research work in labs according to the earn while learn concept. Students are doing internships with stipends within the university also as CTU Ambassadors. The CTU has also implemented NPTEL, IIT Bombay Spoken Tutorial, Virtual Labs, Internshala, and INFLIBNET through the MOOCS concept.  Saylor's Academy of USA provides free online education and certification. For social outreach, the university has the CT Clinical Complex, to provide diagnostic services, pathology lab, physiotherapy services, joint pain treatment and radiology x-ray. It also provides free healthcare service to the residents of the adjoining villages by organizing free medical camps. The university has set up a Center for Social Impact Strategy (CSIS) in which students will be provided hands-on-training for 50 hours per semester. CTU offers the Prof. Saroj Sood Scholarship in association with Sonu Sood to provide free education to students who cannot afford to pay. Under the Pathway Program/Twinning Program, a student can study one year at CTU and another year at foreign universities and get a dual degree. The university has an International and Academic Advisory Boards (IAB and AAB) containing a select group of leading scientists, academicians and educationists from within the country and abroad.

CT Group 
CT Group is a result the establishment of the CT Educational Society in 1997. CT Group is an academic conglomerate comprising multiple educational entities, including CT University, CT Institutions and two schools.

The group offering plethora of programmes in disciplines including Engineering, Pharmaceutical Sciences, Architecture & Design, Hotel Management & Airline Tourism, Sciences, Arts, Commerce, Education via its educational entities of Higher education viz CTU and CT Institutions, Jalandhar (16 Professional Institutes affiliated with government universities on two campuses).

The group has over 10,000 full time enrolled students from various states of India and around 15 other countries. The setting offers a multiethnic culture. The group has certifications by apex bodies such as ISO and NAAC and has received accolades from organizations such as IBM, Brands Impact, and Higher Education Forum.

Academics 
The University Includes:

 School of Engineering and Technology
 School of Management Studies
 School of Humanities and Physical Education
 School of Pharmaceutical and Healthcare Science
 School of Design and Innovation
 School of Agriculture and Natural Science
 School of Law
 School of Hotel Management Airlines and Tourism

Campus
The campus of CT University occupies 36 acres.

References

External links 
 Official CT University

Private universities in India
Universities in Punjab, India
Education in Ludhiana
2016 establishments in Punjab, India
Educational institutions established in 2016